Kevin Okyere is a Ghanaian entrepreneur in the oil industry in Ghana. He is the Founder and Chief Executive Officer of Springfield Energy- a billion dollar oil company. The company was founded in 2008.

Early life and education 
He was born in 1980, to an affluent Ashanti family. Even though he came from a rich family he sold iced water to football supporters at the Kumasi Sports Stadium. He attended Opoku Ware Senior High School, later he left to the USA for further studies in Accounting at the George Mason University in Virginia.

Achievements 
Kevin's company Springfield was given the block, known as West Cape Three Points Block 2, by Ghana’s government in 2016 after it was relinquished by Kosmos. Also, the company is the leader in exporting refined products to land-lock neighbouring countries such as Mali and Burkina Faso and Nigerian's crude. He was awarded at the 2019 Emy Africa Awards as "Man of the Year" for the Oil and Gas category.

References 

Ghanaian businesspeople
1980 births
Living people
Alumni of Opoku Ware School
George Mason University alumni